Libya pursued programs to develop or acquire weapons of mass destruction from when Muammar Gaddafi seized control of Libya in 1969 until he announced on 19 December 2003 that Libya would voluntarily eliminate all materials, equipment and programs that could lead to internationally proscribed weapons. This included weapons of mass destruction (nuclear, chemical and biological weapons) and long-range ballistic missiles.

Libya under King Idris signed the Nuclear Non-Proliferation Treaty (NPT) in 1968 and Gaddafi ratified it in 1975, and concluded a safeguards agreement with the International Atomic Energy Agency (IAEA) in 1980. The United States and the United Kingdom assisted Libya in removing equipment and material from its nuclear weapons program, with independent verification by IAEA.

In 1982, Libya ratified the Biological Weapons Convention.

In 2004, Libya acceded to the Chemical Weapons Convention, and declared 24.7 metric tonnes of mustard gas, 1,390 metric tonnes of chemical precursors for making sarin, as well as 3,563 unloaded chemical weapon munitions (aerial bombs). The OPCW set January 2014 as the deadline for the full destruction of Libya's chemical weapons. Libya began destroying its chemical stockpiles and munitions later in 2004, but it missed deadlines for converting one chemical weapons production facility to peaceful use and for destroying its stockpile of mustard agent. In October 2014, Libya asked for foreign assistance to transport its 850 tonne stockpile of precursor chemicals for making nerve gas out of Libya for destruction. In February 2015, Libyan military sources told media that unidentified armed men had captured large amounts of Libya’s chemical weapons, including mustard gas and sarin. Destruction of Libya's chemical weapon precursors was completed in November 2017.

Libya signed the Treaty on the Prohibition of Nuclear Weapons on 20 September 2017, but has not ratified it.

Nuclear program
King Idris of Libya signed the Non-Proliferation Treaty (NPT) in July 1968. In 1969, Muammar Gaddafi seized control of Libya and had ambitions to acquire nuclear weapons.  Before the rollback of its clandestine nuclear program from late 2003, Libya had a nuclear weapons program, allegedly to counter the covert Israeli nuclear program. Gaddafi ratified NPT in 1975, and concluded the safeguards agreement with the IAEA in 1980. In 1981, the Soviet Union completed a 10 MW research reactor at Tajura. Libya purchased more than 2,000 tons of lightly processed uranium from Niger.

During the 1980s, Gaddafi had reportedly used illicit nuclear proliferation networks and various black market sources, including Swiss nuclear engineer Friedrich Tinner, to start developing the nuclear weapons. The IAEA reported that, in July 1995, Libya had made a “strategic decision to reinvigorate its nuclear activities, including gas centrifuge uranium enrichment,” which can enrich uranium for use in nuclear reactors as well as for fissile material in nuclear weapons. However, at the time its nuclear program was rolled back by Gaddafi (with assistance from the United States and the IAEA), Libya's nuclear program remained in very early initial, developmental stages.

Foreign assistance 
Gaddafi‘s most famous buying foray for nuclear weapons was in 1970, when Libyan leaders paid a state visit to China. Gaddafi and his Prime Minister Abdessalam Jalloud made an unsuccessful attempt to convince China to sell tactical nuclear weapons to Libya. In a bilateral meeting with Chinese Premier Zhou Enlai, Gaddafi unsuccessfully attempted to convince Zhou to sell him a nuclear bomb. Gaddafi's justification for seeking nuclear weapons was his concern over the Israeli nuclear capability, and publicly expressed his desire to obtain nuclear weapons.

After being invited by Prime Minister Zulfikar Ali Bhutto to attend the  2nd OIC conference (OIC) in Lahore, Libya negotiated and was delegated to participate in its nuclear program, Project-706, in 1974. In 1977, Libyan technicians left for Pakistan but by the time Libyans joined the program, the martial law had come in effect against Bhutto in response to end the political deadlock. Before Pakistan's A-bomb project succeeded, Libya had been taken out of the equation as the new President General Zia-ul-Haq had distrusted and strongly disliked Gaddafi. On immediate effects, Libyans were asked to leave the country and the Libyan Intelligence made attempts to infiltrate Pakistan's high-powered research institutes, but such attempts were thwarted by ISI who intercepted and arrested these Libyan agents. Investigators have found that nuclear weapons designs obtained by Libya through a Pakistani smuggling network originated in China.

With relations severed with Pakistan, Gaddafi normalized relations with India in 1978, and Gaddafi reached a mutual understanding with India for civil nuclear cooperation, as part of India's Atoms for Peace program. With the Indian Prime Minister Indira Gandhi visiting Libya in 1984, a nuclear energy pact was signed by Libya and India, but it is unclear how much interaction and cooperation took place. Throughout the 1980s, Libyan efforts continued to push for acquiring nuclear weapons from various sources. In an ingenious persuasion to uranium enrichment in 1978, Libya made an effort to gain access to uranium ore, uranium conversion facilities, and enrichment techniques that together would have enabled Libya to produce weapons-grade uranium. The approach failed in 1979, and in 1980 Libya decided to pursue a plutonium-based pathway to nuclear weapons. Libya imported 1,200 tons of uranium ore concentrate from French-controlled mines in Niger without declaring it to the IAEA, as required by its safeguards agreement. In 1982, Libya attempted to enter into an agreement with Belgium for  purchasing a small plant for manufacturing UF4. At the time, Libya had no declared nuclear facilities that required UF4, and the purchase was refused.

In 1980, Libya began to build its nuclear infrastructure from various nuclear black market sources. The centrifuges materials and expertise were provided by Swiss national, Friedrich Tinner. Tinner's work on centrifuges took place at the TNRF aimed at producing gas centrifuges for uranium enrichment. By the late 1980s, financial constraints and economic sanctions were imposed by the United States in the 1980s, further hampering the nuclear program. Work was completed by Tinner in 1992, but Libya remained unable to produce an operating centrifuge. After the end of Cold War, Gaddafi bluntly persuaded the U.S. President Bill Clinton to uplift the sanctions by allowing the disarmament of its nuclear program.

In 1995, Gaddafi renewed calls for nuclear weapons and pursued new avenues for nuclear technology procurement, while publicizing the NPT. In 1997, Libya received technical documentation and materials on gas centrifuges from various sources, as Libya had made a strategic decision to start the program with a new attitude. Libya employed a large number of black market network, first reeving the 20 pre-assembled centrifuges and components for an additional 200 centrifuges and related parts from foreign suppliers. The pre-assembled rotors for centrifuges were used to install a completed single centrifuge at the Al Hashan site, which was first successfully tested in October 2000.

In 2000, Libya accelerated its efforts, still headed by Tinner. Libya received many documents on the design and operation of centrifuges, but the program suffered many setbacks in evaluating these designs as they were too difficult to interpret and bring into operation. Libya ultimately told IAEA investigators that it had no national personnel competent to evaluate these designs at that time, and due to its extreme difficulty, Libya would have had to ask the supplier for help if it had decided to pursue a nuclear weapon.

Soviet Union
In 1979, Libya pursued peaceful nuclear cooperation with the Soviet Union, under IAEA safeguards. In 1981, the Soviet Union agreed to build a 10 MW research reactor at Tajoura, under IAEA safeguards. The Libyan nuclear program repeatedly suffered under mismanagement and loss of academic generation. The Tajura facility was run under the Soviet experts and staffed by a small number of inexperienced Libyan specialists and technicians. Known as the Tajura Nuclear Research Facility (TNRF), Libya conducted illegal uranium conversion experiments there. An unnamed nuclear weapon state, whose name has been kept secret by the IAEA, also allegedly assisted Libya in these experiments. Nuclear expert David Albright of the Institute for Science and International Security said the Soviet Union and China were the most likely suspects.

In 1984, Libya negotiated with the Soviet Union for a supply of nuclear power plants, but its out-of-date technology dissatisfied Colonel Gaddafi. Gaddafi negotiated with Belgium but the talks failed.  In 1984, Libya negotiated with Japan for a pilot-scale uranium conversion facility.  A Japanese company supplied Libya with the technology, and the sale was apparently arranged directly with the Japanese instead of through middlemen.

In 1991, Libya tried to exploit the chaos generated by the collapse of the Soviet Union to gain access to nuclear technology, expertise, and materials. In 1992, it was reported by an official of the Kurchatov Institute in Moscow claimed that Libya had unsuccessfully tried to recruit two of his colleagues to work at the Tajoura Nuclear Research Center in Libya. Other reports also suggested that Russian scientists had been hired to work on a covert Libyan nuclear program. In March 1998, Russia and Libya signed a contract with the Russian consortium, the Atomenergoeksport for a partial overhaul of the Tajoura Nuclear Research Center.

Dismantlement

The Clinton administration diplomat, Martin Indyk, maintained that the negotiations and diplomatic efforts rolling back Libyan nuclear program were started as early as Bill Clinton assuming the presidency in the 1990s.

Chemical weapons
Libya under Gaddafi actively maintained a chemical weapons program, which was ostensibly decommissioned in the 2000s and early 2010s as Gaddafi sought to normalise relations with the Western world. Libya acceded to the Chemical Weapons Convention with effect on 5 February 2004, and declared 24.7 metric tonnes of mustard gas, 1,390 metric tonnes of chemical precursors for making sarin, as well as 3,563 unloaded chemical weapon munitions (aerial bombs).

The Organisation for the Prohibition of Chemical Weapons (OPCW) supervised the destruction of Libya's chemical weapons caches through February 2011, when it was forced to suspend its operations due to the uprising against Gaddafi and the resulting deterioration of the country's stability. By then, Libya had destroyed 40% of its precursor materials and 55% of its mustard gas, as well as 3,500 chemical weapon munitions. In early September 2011, OPCW Director-General Ahmet Üzümcü said reports he had received indicated that the remaining weapons were secure and had not fallen into the hands of militant groups. A stockpile of mustard gas, which the OPCW reported the regime may have attempted to hide from inspectors overseeing the chemical weapons program's dismantlement, was reportedly found in the Jufra District by anti-Gaddafi fighters less than two weeks later. In late September it was reported by the Wall Street Journal that a major ammunition complex, including chemical-weapons-capable artillery shells, was unguarded and open to looting. In December 2012 a senior Spanish intelligence official said that Al Qaeda in the Islamic Maghreb "probably also has non-conventional arms, basically chemical, as a result of the loss of control of arsenals", with Libya the most likely source.

Libya's National Transitional Council cooperated with the OPCW in the destruction of the remaining chemical weapons. After assessing the chemical stockpiles, the OPCW set a deadline for the destruction of the weapons by the Libyan government. As of September 2013, 1.6 metric tons of mustard blister agent loaded in artillery rounds, 2.5 metric tons of congealed mustard agent, and 846 metric tons of chemical weapons ingredients remained to be destroyed.

According to The New York Times, in February 2014, the remnants of Libya's chemical weapons had been discreetly destroyed by the United States and Libya, using a transportable oven technology to destroy hundreds of bombs and artillery rounds filled with deadly mustard agent.

In September 2014, OPCW said Libya still had around 850 tonnes of industrial chemicals that could be used to produce chemical weapons. In October 2014, Libya asked for foreign assistance to transport that stockpile of raw materials for making nerve gas out of Libya for destruction. On 5 February 2015, the Libyan Minister of Foreign Affairs and the Director-General of OPCW agreed on the need to complete the destruction of the remaining precursor chemicals.

On 21 February 2015, Asharq Al-Awsat reported that an anonymous Libyan army official stated extremists had seized large amounts of Gaddafi’s chemical weapons from multiple locations. The official warned that the targeted caches included mustard gas and sarin. The North Africa Post later reported that chemical weapons were stolen by armed men who stormed the chemical factory in the Jufra district where the weapons were stored. Military sources reportedly stated that among the chemical weapons are mustard gas and sarin. On 31 August 2016, the last stockpile of ingredients for chemical weapons in the country was removed to Germany to avoid it falling into the hands of militants and was slated for destruction. Destruction of Libya's chemical weapon precursors was completed in November 2017.

Ballistic missiles

Libyan Army forces loyal to Gaddafi reportedly fired several Scud-B surface-to-surface missiles at areas in revolt against the regime, including Misrata and Ajdabiya, during the Libyan Civil War of 2011, but the weapons missed their targets. Several more Scuds, with launchers, were found by anti-Gaddafi fighters near Tripoli and Sirte.

See also 

Foreign relations of Libya
Nuclear technology

References 

Nuclear technology
Nuclear technology
Nuclear technology in Libya
Weapons of mass destruction by country
Nuclear weapons programs